Brothers Conflict is an anime television series produced by Brain's Base and directed by Atsushi Matsumoto. The romantic comedy follows the misadventures of Ema Hinata who is the daughter of the famous adventurer Rintarō Hinata. One day, Ema finds out that her dad is going to remarry with a successful apparel maker named Miwa Asahina. Rather than bothering them, she decides to move into the Sunrise Residence complex that is owned by Miwa. From there, she discovers that she has 13 step-brothers.

Episode list

Brothers Conflict

Brothers Conflict Episode 12.5

Brothers Conflict OVA Episode 2

Brothers Conflict OVA Episode 1